Zhang Qi (born 24 December 1984) is a male Chinese shot putter. His personal best throw is 20.15 metres, achieved in October 2005 in Nanjing.

He won the bronze medal at the 2005 Asian Athletics Championships and finished fifth at the 2006 Asian Games. He also competed at the 2006 IAAF World Indoor Championships without reaching the final.

In 2008, he was found guilty of using a banned anabolic agent and banned for four years by the Chinese athletics governing body.

References

1984 births
Living people
Chinese male shot putters
Athletes (track and field) at the 2006 Asian Games
Doping cases in athletics
Chinese sportspeople in doping cases
Asian Games competitors for China
21st-century Chinese people